Giovanni Azzini (28 September 1929 – 4 June 1994) was an Italian footballer who played as a midfielder.

Club career
Azzini played for 5 seasons (152 games, 2 goals) in the Serie A for Calcio Padova.

Match-fixing accusations
Azzini is mostly remembered for being accused of fixing a game that his team Padova lost 0–3 to Atalanta B.C. on 30 March 1958. He maintained that the key witness, his ex-girlfriend Silveria Marchesini, was lying as revenge for him leaving her. Nevertheless, he was found guilty and banned from football for life. The ban was later reduced to 2 years on appeal.

International career
Azzini played his only game for the Italy national football team on 21 July 1952, against Hungary, during the 1952 Summer Olympics.

References

External links
 

1929 births
1994 deaths
Italian footballers
Brescia Calcio players
Calcio Padova players
Italy international footballers
Serie A players
Olympic footballers of Italy
Footballers at the 1952 Summer Olympics
Association football midfielders